The 2017–18 Hong Kong Premier League (also known as BOC Life Hong Kong Premier League for sponsorship reasons) was the fourth season of the Hong Kong Premier League, the top division of Hong Kong football.

Teams 
A total of 10 teams will contest the league, including eight sides from the 2016–17 Hong Kong Premier League, one renamed team and one newly formed team.

Stadia and locations 

Primary venues used in the Hong Kong Premier League:

Remarks:
1The capacity of Aberdeen Sports Ground is artificially reduced from 9,000 to 4,000 as only the main stand is opened for football matches.
2The capacity of Yanzigang Stadium is artificially reduced from 2,000 to 1,000.

Personnel and kits

Managerial changes

Foreign players 
The number of foreign players is restricted to six (including one Asian player) per team, with no more than four on pitch during matches. 
R&F must have at least eight Hong Kong players in the squad and is allowed to register a maximum of 3 foreigners for the season.

League table

Positions by round 
To preserve chronological evolvements, any postponed matches are not included to the round at which they were originally scheduled, but added to the full round they were played immediately afterwards. For example, if a match is scheduled for round 7, but then played between rounds 8 and 9, it will be added to the standings for round 8.

Results

Fixtures and results

Round 1

Round 2

Round 3

Round 4

Round 5

Round 6

Round 7

Round 8

Round 9

Round 10

Round 11

Round 12

Round 13

Round 14

Round 15

Round 16

Round 17

Round 18

Scoring

Top Scorers

Hat-tricks 
Note: The results column shows the scorer's team score first. Teams in bold are home teams.

Clean sheets

Attendances

Hong Kong Top Footballer Awards

References 

Hong Kong Premier League seasons
Hong Kong
2017–18 in Hong Kong football